Allerastria is a genus of moths of the family Erebidae.

Taxonomy
The genus has previously been classified in the subfamily Phytometrinae within Erebidae or in the subfamily Acontiinae of the family Noctuidae.

Species
Allerastria albiciliatus (Smith, 1903)
Allerastria annae Brown, 1987

References

Natural History Museum Lepidoptera genus database

Boletobiinae
Noctuoidea genera